Archaeophya is a small genus of dragonflies belonging to the family Gomphomacromiidae.
Species of Archaeophya are large dragonflies with metallic bodies, dark with yellow spots and clear wings. They only occur in eastern Australia.

Species
The genus contains the following two species:
Archaeophya adamsi  – horned urfly
Archaeophya magnifica  – magnificent urfly

Note about family
There are differing views as to the family that Archaeophya best belongs to:
 It is considered to be part of the Gomphomacromiidae family at the Australian Faunal Directory
 It is considered to be part of the Synthemistidae family in the World Odonata List at the Slater Museum of Natural History
 It is considered to be part of the Corduliidae family at Wikispecies

See also
 List of Odonata species of Australia

References

Gomphomacromiidae
Synthemistidae

 Anisoptera genera
Odonata of Australia
Endemic fauna of Australia
Taxa named by Frederic Charles Fraser
Insects described in 1959